is a fictional character who debuted as the lead character of Capcom's 1989 beat-em-up Final Fight. He went on to appear as a playable character in several Street Fighter titles, beginning with Street Fighter Alpha 3. He has also appeared in Final Fight-related spin-offs. Cody is an American street brawler and vigilante who specializes in knife fighting. Cody’s full name was first given in Final Fight: Streetwise, which is later acknowledged in the Street Fighter mainline games as of Street Fighter V. The character's reception has been mostly positive.

Appearances

In video games
Cody first appears as the lead character of the 1989 beat-em-up Final Fight, where he is one of the three playable characters in the game, with Cody being the well-balanced character of the trio. In the game, he is a martial artist whose girlfriend Jessica has been kidnapped by the Mad Gear Gang. He teams up with his friend and rival Guy, and Jessica's father Haggar, to defeat the gang. In the game, he wears hand wraps, a white T-shirt, blue jeans, and tennis shoes.

After the events of Final Fight, Cody is mentioned in the SNES sequel, Final Fight 2, where he is shown in the opening flashback to be the one delivering the finishing blow to the Mad Gear gang's leader, Belger, from within the first game, but Cody himself does not appear within the second game at all. His absence from the second game was given an in-story explanation that he was taking a vacation with Jessica during the time of Final Fight 2.

Cody makes a cameo appearance in Guy's Final Fight-themed home stage in Street Fighter Alpha 2, where he is being cuddled by his girlfriend Jessica at the left corner of the stage; if a female character is in front of Cody, he will draw his attention away from Jessica and towards the female fighter for a moment until an envious Jessica slaps Cody in the face and regains his attention. The couple makes a similar cameo appearance in Marvel Super Heroes vs. Street Fighter, in which they're among the spectators watching the fight at the background of the "Mall Madness" stage.

His next major appearance was in 1998's Street Fighter Alpha 3, being the fourth Final Fight character to appear in the Alpha sub-series. In this game, Cody had ended his relationship with Jessica (who has since left Metro City to study abroad in Europe) and became a convicted felon, having been thrown into jail after becoming a vigilante. Bored with his peaceful life, Cody had wandered the streets looking for any riffraff he could find, and subsequently beat them into submission until he was finally caught and jailed. Instead of his jeans and white T-shirt from Final Fight, Cody's wardrobe now consists of a blue-and-white striped prison uniform with handcuffs on his wrists (which he is actually able to remove when he taunts his opponent, but fights wearing them anyway) and stubble on his face. His fighting style in the game is modeled after his abilities from Final Fight. During his single-player storyline, Cody is challenged by Birdie and ends up joining forces with his friend and former ally Guy in his fight against M. Bison.

Cody would appear in two subsequent Final Fight games following his appearance in Alpha 3. Final Fight Revenge, an American-developed 3D fighting game based on Final Fight also released in 1998, features Cody from within his depiction in the original Final Fight. In his character's ending, he gets arrested by police officer Edi E. after being framed by the surviving members of Mad Gear and he is shown in Poison's ending wearing the same jailbird outfit he wears in Street Fighter Alpha 3. A second American-produced Final Fight spinoff, 2006's Final Fight: Streetwise, features Cody Travers as the elder brother and mentor of the new main character, Kyle Travers. Cody wears his classic original outfit, but with an orange prison shirt over the T-shirt. Prior to the events of the game, Cody was willingly incarcerated for an unspecified crime committed by Guy, causing a fallout between the two former friends. Upon getting out of prison, Cody's constant fighting had taken its toll upon his own knees, in which he had developed arthritis from within them and that Cody himself was forced to retire from mainstream fighting, becoming a cornerman for Kyle during his run from within Metro City's underground pit fighting circuit. During the events of Final Fight Streetwise, Kyle learns that Cody had been taking a new street drug known as "GLOW", which is said to give the user immense strength and power, but turns them violent and dangerous at the same time. Eventually, Cody is kidnapped by Father Bella (who is later revealed to be the younger brother of Belger) and is used as a brainwashed guinea pig by Bella, who seeks revenge against him for the death of his brother. In the end, Cody regains his senses and helps Kyle defeat Bella. Few days later, the effect of the GLOW cures Cody from arthritis when returning to his former human-self.

Cody returned as one of the new characters in Super Street Fighter IV, breaking out of prison to try to cure his boredom. His rival is Guy, who tries to convince him to team with him to fight Seth. In his ending after he defeats Seth, Cody runs into Guy once again and after deflecting Guy's praise, leaves to return to his cell where he claims he belongs. Cody is also featured as a playable character via DLC in Street Fighter X Tekken, with Guy as his official tag partner.

Cody returned as a playable character in Street Fighter V as part of its third season of downloadable content. Now free from prison and no longer forced to wear the uniform and handcuffs, Cody succeeds Mike Haggar as the new Mayor of Metro City. Though he is bored with the bureaucracy of the position and misses fighting the city's gangs, he secretly enjoys his new life.

Gameplay
In Final Fight, Cody is a balanced character with both moderate strength and speed; being the only player capable of stabbing when armed with a knife within the game. By the time of his appearance in Street Fighter Alpha 3, Cody has gained new special moves and super combos. His trademark attacks are the "Bad Stone", in which he throws a normal rock with the force of other fighter's projectiles; the "Criminal Upper", in which he throws an uppercut that releases a multi-hitting tornado that blocks projectiles; the "Ruffian Kick", a charging kick attack that varies on attack level depending on which button is used; and the ability to use a knife lying in the middle of the stage in all of his fights, which Cody can pick up and use.

Final Fight: Streetwise sees an alternate version of Cody, dubbed "Death", as he was chosen by a Metro City priest, Father Bella, to be a living incarnation of one of the Four Horsemen of the Apocalypse. This version of Cody has a more demonic look to him due to the fact that Cody is drugged with a mysterious substance that is dubbed "The GLOW" (in reference to how the eyes of the user looked after taking the drug) and has a version of the "Criminal Upper" that emits a greenish glow. In addition, he gains the ability to throw waves of green energy that travel along the ground like many projectiles in SNK fighting games, as well as the ability to rain green energy down around himself.

In the Street Fighter series, Cody's attack speed has been reduced. Similar to Makoto, he relies on hard-hitting strikes from multiple directions to keep the opponent guessing. As a callback to Final Fight, Cody can use a knife to augment his attacks. In Super Street Fighter IV, he also uses a pipe and wrench during certain attacks which can be accessed in stages exclusively. In Street Fighter V, Cody returns as a balanced character including drastic changes to his moves, thanks to being appointed Mayor of Metro City in the time between Super Street Fighter IV and Street Fighter V. For instance, his trademark knife and pipe are accessible via either of his V-Trigger boosts, whereas his hand-to-hand attacks take heavy inspiration from his previous appearances in the past Final Fight games.

In other media
An episode of the American Street Fighter animated series titled "Final Fight" adapts the plot of the original 1989 beat-em-up game, with Cody portrayed as a slow-witted, short-tempered character with a southern accent. In the episode, Cody and Guy, after learning that Cody's girlfriend and Haggar's daughter Jessica is kidnapped by the Mad Gear gang, go off to fight them on their own accord, while Ryu and Ken are hired by Haggar to infiltrate the gang in order to help find and save his daughter. Cody knocks Belger from the top window of his penthouse (although Belger is not killed), and rescues Jessica. He also appears in some of the Street Fighter comics by UDON. In Resident Evil Zero, Billy Coen can have Cody's prison outfit as an extra costume as a DLC. Professional wrestler Kenny Omega portrayed Cody for a live action Street Fighter V trailer.

Reception
Cody's reception has been mostly positive. Cody was one of the seven characters that IGN wished most to see in Street Fighter IV, while WhatCulture included him among the ten characters they wished to see appear in Ultimate Marvel vs. Capcom 3. In the official survey by Namco, Cody is the 16th most requested character to be added to the roster of Tekken X Street Fighter on the Street Fighter side. He was ranked the 45th top Street Fighter character by UGO.com. Ryan Woo of Complex included Cody from the early Final Fight games on 2011 list of 25 most stylish video game characters. That same year, Complex also ranked him as the 38th "most dominant" fighting game character, as "a shining example" of "a fallen hero becomes a kickass crook when being the good guy gets boring", adding, "Who else you know can manage to fight with handcuffs on the whole time?" Actor Robin Williams named his son Cody Williams after a video game character, which is believed to be Cody from Final Fight. In a 2018 worldwide poll by Capcom, Cody was voted fifth most popular Street Fighter character.

References

Capcom protagonists
Characters designed by Akira Yasuda
Fictional American people in video games
Fictional criminals in video games
Fictional European-American people
Fictional knife-fighters
Fictional martial artists in video games
Fictional mayors
Fictional prisoners and detainees in the United States
Final Fight characters
Male characters in video games
Politician characters in video games
Street Fighter characters
Video game characters introduced in 1989
Video game characters with air or wind abilities
Vigilante characters in video games